Rose Mathisen (born 25 August 1959 in Stord, Norway) is a Swedish dressage rider.

Biography
She was a member of the silver winning team during the 2017 FEI European Championships in Gothenburg, Sweden. In 2011, she placed 4th with the Swedish team during the 2011 European Championships in Rotterdam, Netherlands, and was the first reserve for the 2012 Olympic Games in London, United Kingdom. In 2017, she became Swedish National Champion.

References

Living people
1959 births
Swedish female equestrians
Swedish dressage riders
Norwegian emigrants to Sweden